The 1992 Federation Cup was the 30th edition of the most important competition between national teams in women's tennis.  For the first time, qualifying rounds were split among three regional zones, each sending teams to the main World Group tournament. Germany defeated Spain in the final, held on 19 July, giving Germany their second title and first since the German reunification.

Qualifying rounds
 Nations in bold qualified for the World Group.

Americas Zone

Venue: Atlas Colomos T.C, Guadalajara, Mexico (outdoor clay)

Dates: April 21–25

Participating Teams

Asia/Oceania Zone

Venue: National Tennis Centre, Colombo, Sri Lanka (outdoor clay)

Dates: May 4–8

Participating Teams

Europe/Africa Zone

Venue: Olympic T.C., Athens, Greece (outdoor clay)

Dates: April 13–18

Participating Teams

World Group

Venue: Waldstadion T.C., Frankfurt, Germany (outdoor clay)

Dates: July 13–19

Draw

World Group play-offs

Venue: Waldstadion T.C., Frankfurt, Germany (outdoor clay)

Dates: July 16–17

The sixteen teams that lost in the World Group first round ties played off in the first round, with the eight winning moving through to the play-off round. The four nations that won their play-off tie would remain in the World Group in 1993.

External links 
 1992 Fed Cup 

 
Billie Jean King Cups by year
Federation
1992 in women's tennis